The Sobieski coal mine is a large mine in the south of Poland in Jaworzno, Silesian Voivodeship, 350 km south-west of the capital, Warsaw. Sobieski represents one of the largest coal reserve in Poland having estimated reserves of 134.1 million tonnes of coal. The annual coal production is around 6.4 million tonnes.

References

External links 
 Official site

Coal mines in Poland
Buildings and structures in Jaworzno
Coal mines in Silesian Voivodeship